Stephen Harris Holt (born 1974 in Darwin, Northern Territory) is a former field hockey defender and midfielder from Australia, who was a member of the team that won the bronze medal at the 2000 Summer Olympics in Sydney.

He was nicknamed Shaggy by his teammates.

He now resides in Yankalilla South Australia where he spends time with his family and competes in the local hockey competition and mentors young aspiring players to follow in his footsteps.

References
 Profile on Hockey Australia

External links

1974 births
Living people
Australian male field hockey players
Olympic field hockey players of Australia
Olympic bronze medalists for Australia
Field hockey players at the 2000 Summer Olympics
1998 Men's Hockey World Cup players
Sportspeople from Darwin, Northern Territory
Olympic medalists in field hockey
Medalists at the 2000 Summer Olympics
Commonwealth Games medallists in field hockey
Commonwealth Games gold medallists for Australia
Field hockey players at the 1998 Commonwealth Games
Medallists at the 1998 Commonwealth Games